Ror Wolf (born Richard Georg Wolf; 29 June 1932 – 17 February 2020) was a German writer, poet, and artist who also published under the pseudonym Raoul Tranchirer. He wrote audio plays, novels, and poems and made collages.

Life 
Richard Georg (Ror) Wolf was born in Saalfeld, Thuringia. He grew up without his father, who was drafted into the army when the boy was six and only returned ten years later. The child enjoyed his father's library, reading the books of Wilhelm Busch at an early age. Following World War II, the new government socialized the family's shoe shop, and his mother was imprisoned for one year. After his Abitur in 1951, he applied for a place to study at university but was not successful. He worked for two years in construction. After his application to university was rejected again, Wolf left the German Democratic Republic in July 1953 to live in West Germany. He first stayed in Stuttgart, making a living as an unskilled laborer. Later he studied literature, sociology and philosophy at the University of Frankfurt, with Theodor W. Adorno, Walter Höllerer and Max Horkheimer. Wolf soon published prose, poetry, reviews of literature, theatre and jazz as well as artistic collages in the student magazine Diskus. His name as an artist ("Ror") combines letters from his given names. His pseudonym ("Tranchirer") is his first name, Richard, spelled backward and turned into "Tranchirer," someone who "carves up [meat]." Cutting would become an important technique both in Wolf's literary and visual work. Wolf continued his studies in Hamburg in 1958, and graduated from the University of Frankfurt in 1961.

Wolf worked as  contributing editor of literature for the Hessischer Rundfunk, a public radio station, for two years. After 1963 he became a freelance writer and artist.. His first novel, Fortsetzung des Berichts, was published by Suhrkamp in 1964. It shows influences of Franz Kafka, Samuel Beckett and Peter Weiss. His first radio play was broadcast in 1971. His radio collages often focus on soccer and keep being aired. The play Leben und Tod des Kornettisten Bix Beiderbecke aus Nord-Amerika, about the life and death of jazz cornetist Bix Beiderbecke, was awarded the prestigious Hörspielpreis der Kriegsblinden in 1988. The 2007 audio play Raoul Tranchirers Bemerkungen über die Stille -- R T's Comments on Silence received the award "Radio Play of the Year" from the German Academy of Performing Arts.

Wolf settled in Mainz where he lived for 30 years. He died there on 17 February 2020.

Works 
Wolf's texts often begin in simple everyday-life situations, changing abruptly to the grotesque in a combination of comical and horrible aspects. He worked last on an autobiography in the form of a collage. The publisher plans a complete edition of his works, not only those already published, entitled Ror Wolf Werke (RWW):

 Vol. 1:  (ed.): Im Zustand vergrößerter Ruhe. Die Gedichte. 2009.
 Vol. 2:  (ed.): Prosa I: . 2010, .
 Vol. 3:  (ed.): Prosa II: Pilzer und Pelzer. 2010.
 Vol. 4: Jürgens (ed.): Prosa III: Die Gefährlichkeit der großen Ebene. 2012, .
 Vol. 5: Jürgens (ed.): Prosa IV: Nachrichten aus der bewohnten Welt. 2014, .
 Vol. 7: Hans Burkhard Schlichting (ed.): Die Einsamkeit des Meeresgrunds. Die Hörspiele. 2012, .
 Vol. 9: Thomas Schröder (ed.): Raoul Tranchirers Enzyklopädie für unerschrockene Leser. Vol. II. 2009.

Volume 1 contains the poems, volumes 2 to 5 prose works, volume 7 the audio plays, and volume 9 Raoul Tranchirers Enzyklopädie für unerschrockene Leser, an encyclopedia for "intrepid readers".

Translations

English 

 Two Or Three Years Later: Forty-Nine Digressions (Open Letter Books, 2012), translated by Jennifer Marquart. .
 "A Discovery Behind the House" (Asymptote, 2018 ), translated by Barbara Thimm.

French 

 Le terrible festin (Gallimard, 1970), translated by Lily Jumel.

Italian 

 Tentativi di mantenere la calma (Mobydick, 2001), translated by Giovanni Nadiani.

Awards 
The Schiller Memorial Prize's jury wrote in 2016:

References

External links 
 
  in German)
 
 
 
 Ror Wolf / wetterverhältnisse lyrikline.org 2020 (in German)
 "Das ist eigentlich alles" (interview, in German, with Joachim Feldmann and Rudolf Gier) in the literary journal , Münster, 1988
 Kay Sokolowsky: Ein ziemlich unsichtbarer Mann in taz, 29 June 2002, on the occasion of Wolf's 70th birthday (in German)

1932 births
2020 deaths
German male writers
German poets